Pustula tragopogonis, the goatsbeard white rust, is an oomycete plant pathogen unrelated to fungal organisms.

Albugo tragopogonis is the old name for Pustula tragopogonis, the causal agent of white blister disease on goatsbeard (Tragopogon spp.).

References

Water mould plant pathogens and diseases
Albuginaceae